Daniel Michael Firova (born October 16, 1956) is an American professional baseball catcher and coach. He is the quality control coach for the Houston Astros of Major League Baseball. In most of those games, he entered late in the game as a defensive replacement. He came to the plate a grand total of seven times with no hits or walks.

Playing career
While Firova was a freshman at Refugio High School, he accidentally cut off the little finger on his throwing hand with a band saw in shop class. Despite this, he earned a two-year baseball scholarship at Bee County College. After that, he played baseball at Pan American College, where he earned his degree, and was subsequently drafted by the Mariners. He spent two seasons in the minor leagues with various teams, made his major league debut for the Mariners on September 1, 1981, and played in 13 games. He also played in two games in 1982, but primarily spent 1981, 1982, and 1983 with the Nuevo Laredo Tecolotes of the Mexican League.

Firova returned to the Mariners organization in 1985, and remained with them through 1987. He signed with the Cleveland Indians in 1988, and played in one major league game for them. He spent 1989 with the Chicago Cubs organization, then played in the Mexican League through 1993.

Coaching career
Firova served as the manager of Vaqueros Laguna in the Mexican League. He began managing in the Mexican League in 1993, and was named that league's Manager of the Year in 2000.

The Washington Nationals announced on December 15, 2015 that Firova would serve as Bullpen Coach with the team. His contract with them expired after the 2017 season.

Firova was announced as the manager for the Class AAA Acereros de Monclova of the Mexican League for the Spring Tournament of the 2018 season. He was not brought back for the second tournament of the season. 

In 2019, Firova returned to Acereros de Monclova as the team's bench coach. 

On January 28, 2021  Firova joined the Houston Astros to serve as Quality Control coach with the major league team.  In 2022, the Astros won 106 games, the second-highest total in franchise history.  They advanced to the World Series and defeated the Philadelphia Phillies in six games to give Firova his first career World Series title.

References

External links

1956 births
Living people
American expatriate baseball players in Canada
American expatriate baseball players in Mexico
Bakersfield Mariners players
Baseball players from Texas
Bellingham Mariners players
Calgary Cannons players
Charlotte Knights players
Chattanooga Lookouts players
Colorado Springs Sky Sox players
Cleveland Indians players
Houston Astros coaches
Jacksonville Suns players
Major League Baseball bullpen coaches
Major League Baseball catchers
Mexican League baseball managers
Minor league baseball managers
People from Refugio, Texas
Reno Silver Sox players
Salinas Spurs players
San Jose Missions players
Seattle Mariners players
Spokane Indians players
UT Rio Grande Valley Vaqueros baseball players
Washington Nationals coaches
Williamsport Bills players
Winston-Salem Spirits players
American disabled sportspeople
Sportspeople with limb difference
Baseball players with disabilities